The history of education in Japan dates back at least to the sixth century, when Chinese learning was introduced at the Yamato court. Foreign civilizations have often provided new ideas for the development of Japan's own culture.

6th to 15th century
Chinese teachings and ideas flowed into Japan from the sixth to the ninth century. Along with the introduction of Buddhism came the Chinese system of writing and its literary tradition, and Confucianism.

By the ninth century, Heian-kyō (today's Kyoto), the imperial capital, had five institutions of higher learning, and during the remainder of the Heian period, other schools were established by the nobility and the imperial court. During the medieval period (1185–1600), Zen Buddhist monasteries were especially important centers of learning, and the Ashikaga School, Ashikaga Gakkō, flourished in the fifteenth century as a center of higher learning.

16th century
In the sixteenth century Japan experienced intense contact with the major European powers. Jesuit missionaries, who accompanied Portuguese traders, preached Christianity and opened a number of religious schools. Japanese students thus began to study Latin and Western classical music, as well as their own language.

see: Nanban trade period

Edo period
Japan was very unified by the Tokugawa regime (1600–1867); and the Neo-Confucian academy, the  Yushima Seidō in Edo was the chief educational institution of the state.  Its administrative head was called Daigaku-no-kami as head of the Tokugawa training school for shogunate bureaucrats.

When the Tokugawa period began, few common people in Japan could read or write. By the period's end, learning had become widespread. Tokugawa education left a valuable legacy: an increasingly literate populace, a meritocratic ideology, and an emphasis on discipline and competent performance. Under subsequent Meiji leadership, this foundation would facilitate Japan's rapid transition from feudal society country to a modernizing nation.

During the Tokugawa period, the role of many of the bushi, or samurai, changed from warrior to government bureaucrat, and as a consequence, their formal education and their literacy increased proportionally. Samurai curricula stressed morality and included both military and literary studies. Confucian classics were memorized, and reading and reciting them were common methods of study. Arithmetic and calligraphy were also studied.  Most samurai attended schools sponsored by their han (domains), and by the time of the Meiji Restoration of 1868, more than 200 of the 276 han had established schools. Some samurai and even commoners also attended private academies, which often specialized in particular Japanese subjects or in Western medicine, modern military science, gunnery, or Rangaku (Dutch studies), as European studies were called.

Education of commoners was generally practically oriented, providing basic training in reading, writing, and arithmetic, emphasizing calligraphy and use of the abacus. Much of this education was conducted in so-called temple schools (terakoya), derived from earlier Buddhist schools. These schools were no longer religious institutions, nor were they, by 1867, predominantly located in temples. By the end of the Tokugawa period, there were more than 11,000 such schools, attended by 750,000 students. Teaching techniques included reading from various textbooks, memorizing, abacus, and repeatedly copying Chinese characters and Japanese script.

Public education was provided for the Samurai, ordinary people taught the rudiments to their own children or joined together to hire a young teacher.  By the 1860s, 40–50% of Japanese boys, and 15% of the girls, had some schooling outside the home.  These rates were comparable to major European nations at the time (apart from Germany, which had compulsory schooling).

In 1858 Fukuzawa Yukichi founded a private school of Western studies which then became Keio University, known as a leading institute in Japanese higher education.

Meiji period
See Education in the Empire of Japan.

After 1868 new leadership set Japan on a rapid course of modernization. The Meiji leaders established a public education system to help Japan catch up with the West and form a modern nation. Missions like the Iwakura mission were sent abroad to study the education systems of leading Western countries. They returned with the ideas of decentralization, local school boards, and teacher autonomy. Such ideas and ambitious initial plans, however, proved very difficult to carry out. After some trial and error, a new national education system emerged. As an indication of its success, elementary school enrollments climbed from about 30% percent of the school-age population in the 1870s to more than 90 percent by 1900, despite strong public protest, especially against school fees.

A modern concept of childhood emerged in Japan after 1850 as part of its engagement with the West. Meiji era leaders decided the nation-state had the primary role in mobilizing individuals—and children—in service of the state. The Western-style school was introduced as the agent to reach that goal. By the 1890s, schools were generating new sensibilities regarding childhood.  After 1890 Japan had numerous reformers, child experts, magazine editors, and well-educated mothers who bought into the new sensibility. They taught the upper middle class a model of childhood that included children having their own space where they read children's books, played with educational toys and, especially, devoted enormous time to school homework. These ideas rapidly disseminated through all social classes 

After 1870 school textbooks based on Confucian ethics were replaced by westernized texts. However, by the 1890s, after earlier intensive preoccupation with Western, particularly American educational ideas, a more authoritarian approach was imposed. Traditional Confucian and Shinto precepts were again stressed, especially those concerning the hierarchical nature of human relations, service to the new state, the pursuit of learning, and morality. These ideals, embodied in the 1890 Imperial Rescript on Education, along with highly centralized government control over education, largely guided Japanese education until 1945, when they were massively repudiated.

1912 - 1945
In the early 20th century, education at the primary level was egalitarian and virtually universal, but at higher levels it was multitracked, highly selective, and elitist. College education was largely limited to the few imperial universities, where German influences were strong. Three of the imperial universities admitted women, and there were a number of women's colleges, some quite prestigious, but women had relatively few opportunities to enter higher education. During this period, a number of universities were founded by Christian missionaries, who also took an active role in expanding educational opportunities for women, particularly at the secondary level.

After 1919 several of the private universities received official status and were granted government recognition for programs they had conducted, in many cases, since the 1880s. In the 1920s, the tradition of liberal education briefly reappeared, particularly at the kindergarten level, where the Montessori method attracted a following. In the 1930s, education was subject to strong military and nationalistic influences, under Sadao Araki.

Occupation period

By 1945 the Japanese education system had been devastated, and with the defeat came the discredit of much prewar thought. A new wave of foreign ideas was introduced during the postwar period of military occupation.

Occupation policy makers and the United States Education Mission, set up in 1946, made a number of changes aimed at democratizing Japanese education: instituting the six-three-three grade structure (six years of elementary school, three of lower-secondary school, and three of upper-secondary school) and extending compulsory schooling to nine years. They replaced the prewar system of higher-secondary schools with comprehensive upper-secondary schools (high schools). Curricula and textbooks were revised, the nationalistic morals course was abolished and replaced with social studies, locally elected school boards were introduced, and teachers unions established.

With the abolition of the elitist higher education system and an increase in the number of higher education institutions, the opportunities for higher learning grew. Expansion was accomplished initially by granting university or junior college status to a number of technical institutes, normal schools, and advanced secondary schools.

Post-occupation period
After the restoration of full national sovereignty in 1952, Japan immediately began to modify some of the changes in education, to reflect Japanese ideas about education and educational administration. The postwar Ministry of Education regained a great deal of power. School boards were appointed, instead of elected. A course in moral education was reinstituted in modified form, despite substantial initial concern that it would lead to a renewal of heightened nationalism. The post-occupation period also witnessed a significant widening of educational opportunities.  From 1945 to 1975, the ratio of junior high school graduates who went on to high school rose considerably, from 42.5% in 1950 to 91.9% in 1975.

By the 1960s, postwar recovery and accelerating economic growth brought new demands to expand higher education.  But as the expectations grew that the quality of higher education would improve, the costs of higher education also increased.  In general, the 1960s was a time of great turbulence in higher education. Late in the decade especially, universities in Japan were rocked by violent student riots that disrupted many campuses.  Campus unrest was the confluence of a number of factors, including the anti-Vietnam War movement in Japan, ideological differences between various Japanese student groups, disputes over campus issues, such as discipline; student strikes, and even general dissatisfaction with the university system itself.

The government responded with the University Control Law in 1969 and, in the early 1970s, with further education reforms. New laws governed the founding of new universities and teachers' compensation, and public school curricula were revised. Private education institutions began to receive public aid, and a nationwide standardized university entrance examination was added for the national universities. Also during this period, strong disagreement developed between the government and teachers groups.

Despite the numerous educational changes that have occurred in Japan since 1868, and especially since 1945, the education system still reflects long-standing cultural and philosophical ideas: that learning and education are esteemed and to be pursued seriously, and that moral and character development are integral to education. The meritocratic legacy of the Meiji period has endured, as has the centralized education structure. Interest remains in adapting foreign ideas and methods to Japanese traditions and in improving the system generally.

1980s
In spite of the admirable success of the education system since World War II, problems remained through the 1980s. There was also a belief that education was responsible for some social problems and for the general academic, behavioral, and adjustment problems of some students. There was great concern too that Japanese education be responsive to the new requirements caused by international challenges of the changing world in the twenty-first century.

Flexibility, creativity, individuality, and diversity thus became the watchwords of Japan's momentous education reform movement of the 1980s, although they echoed themes heard earlier, particularly in the 1970s. The proposals and potential changes of the 1980s were so significant that some compared them to the educational changes that occurred when Japan opened to the West in the nineteenth century and to those of the occupation.

Concerns of the new reform movement were captured in a series of reports issued between 1985 and 1987 by the National Council on Educational Reform, set up by Prime Minister Yasuhiro Nakasone. The final report outlined basic emphases in response to the internationalization of education, new information technologies, and the media and emphases on individuality, lifelong learning, and adjustment to social change. To explore these new directions, the council suggested that eight specific subjects be considered: designing education for the twenty-first century; organizing a system of lifelong learning and reducing the emphasis on the educational background of individuals; improving and diversifying higher education; enriching and diversifying elementary and secondary education; improving the quality of teachers; adapting to internationalization; adapting to the information age; and conducting a review of the administration and finance of education. These subjects reflected both educational and social aspects of the reform, in keeping with the Japanese view about the relationship of education to society. Even as debate over reform took place, the government quickly moved to begin implementing changes in most of these eight areas. These reforms have been on-going, and although most have now forgotten about the work done by the reform council in the 1980s, the contents of many changes can be traced back to this time.

History of women's education
Education for females, often bound by constraints, had become an issue as far back as in the Heian period over a thousand years ago. But the Sengoku period finally made it clear that women had to be educated to defend the country when their husbands died. The Tale of Genji was written by a well-educated female from the Heian period and writings by women blossomed throughout Japanese history. However, Chika Kuroda was the first female Bachelor of Science, graduating in 1916 from Tohoku Imperial University.

See also
Rangaku
Han school (schools run by daimyōs)
National Seven Universities
Imperial Rescript on Education
Foreign government advisors in Meiji Japan
Japanese history textbook controversies
Shotouka-Chiri

References

Further reading
 Beauchamp, Edward R., ed. Education and Schooling in Japan since 1945 (Routledge, 2014).
 Beauchamp, Edward R., and Richard Rubinger, eds. Education in Japan: A Source Book (2nd ed. Routledge, 2017).
 De Bary, William Theodore, et al. eds. Sources of Japanese Tradition, Vol. 2. (Columbia University Press, 2005).  ; ; OCLC  255020415
 Dore,  R. P. "The Legacy of Tokugawa Education," in Marius B. Jansen, ed., Changing Japanese Attitudes toward Modernization (Princeton University Press, 1965) pp 99–131.
 Jones, Mark. Children as Treasures: Childhood and the Middle Class in Early Twentieth Century Japan (Harvard University Asia Center, 2010)
 Kelly, Boyd. (1999). Encyclopedia of Historians and Historical Writing, Vol. 1. London: Taylor & Francis. 
 Passin, Herbert. Society & Education in Japan (Kodansha USA, 1965)
 Platt, Brian. "Japanese Childhood, Modern Childhood: The Nation-State, the School, and 19th-Century Globalization", Journal of Social History (2005) 38#4, pp 965–985 online
 Saito, Hiro. "Cosmopolitan Nation-Building: The Institutional Contradiction and Politics of Postwar Japanese Education", Social Science Japan Journal, Summer 2011, Vol. 14 Issue 2, pp 125–44
 Uno, Kathleen S. Passages to Modernity: Motherhood, Childhood, and Social Reform in Early Twentieth Century Japan. (University of Hawai'i Press, 1999). 
 Yamasaki, Yoko. "The Impact of Western Progressive Educational Ideas in Japan: 1868–1940", History of Education, September 2010, Vol. 39 Issue 5, pp 575–588